Malcolm George Mackay AM (29 December 1919 – 8 July 1999) was an Australian clergyman and politician. He was a member of federal parliament from 1963 to 1972, representing the Liberal Party, and served as Minister for the Navy in the McMahon Government. He was an ordained Presbyterian minister and prior to entering parliament served as the general secretary of the Australian division of the World Council of Churches.

Early life
Mackay was born in Brighton, South Australia and educated at Adelaide Technical High School. During World War II he served in the Royal Australian Navy. After the war he earned a B.A. degree from the University of Sydney and a B.D. degree from the University of Melbourne. He obtained a doctorate from the University of Edinburgh.

Church activities
Mackay returned to Australia to be a Presbyterian minister. He was ordained and inducted to the Merbein-Wentworth parish on 1 July 1952, demitted 14 June 1954 and from 1954 until 1956, he was the Australian General Secretary for the World Council of Churches. In September 1956 he became the first Australian born minister at Sydney's Scots Church. He became the foundation Master of Basser College at the University of New South Wales in 1959. He was also one of the first prominent churchmen in Australia to pursue an active career on television. He monitored the Burning Question program on Channel 7 from 1957 until 1961 before moving to the ABC for the current affairs program Open Hearing. He was later assistant minister of the Scots Church, Melbourne, 1975–76 and 1982–84.

Politics
Mackay was elected as the Liberal Party member for the House of Representatives seat of Evans from the 1963 election. He was Minister for the Navy from March 1971 until his defeat by Allan Mulder at the December 1972 election. Mackay was the founding president of the Association of Former Members of the Parliament of Australia, and he remained an executive member of the association until his death.

Personal life and honours
Mackay was made a Member of the Order of Australia in 1986 for "services to the community particularly in the fields of religion, education and politics."  He and his wife, Ruth died in a car accident in Melbourne.  One of their daughters, Elspeth, died in 1981 also as a result of a car accident. Malcolm and Ruth were survived by their other daughter Margie and son Andrew.

Notes

Liberal Party of Australia members of the Parliament of Australia
Members of the Australian House of Representatives for Evans
Members of the Australian House of Representatives
1919 births
1999 deaths
Members of the Order of Australia
Alumni of the University of Edinburgh
20th-century Australian politicians
Australian Presbyterian ministers
Royal Australian Navy personnel of World War II
University of Sydney alumni
University of Melbourne alumni
Academic staff of the University of New South Wales
Australian television personalities
Road incident deaths in Victoria (Australia)